FIFF may refer to:

 Michel Fiffe (born 1979), Cuban–American comic book artist
 Fajr International Film Festival, in Tehran, Iran
 Festival International du Film Francophone de Namur, a film festival held in Namur, Belgium
 Fribourg International Film Festival, a film festival held in Fribourg, Switzerland
 F Is for Family, American animated series